Chen Ke (born 1978 in Tongjiang, Sichuan, China) is a Chinese artist. She currently lives and works in Beijing. Having participated in numerous international and domestic exhibitions, Chen Ke has worked in a variety of media, including painting, sculpture and fashion design. Chen Ke is recognized as the most representative artist of the New Generation of Cartoon of China.

Background 

Chen Ke was born in Tongjiang, Sichuan Province of China. When Chen Ke needed to select her major in the university, she read a book about Vincent Van Gogh. She was deeply touched by the story of Van Gogh and decided to major in oil painting. It was at this moment that she came up with the thought of becoming an artist. Following her graduation from Sichuan Fine Arts Institute in 2002, she succeeded in getting her master's degree in oil painting in the same institute in 2005. Later, she came to Beijing with her husband to seek her dream of becoming an artist.

Chen Ke thought all of her paintings were part of her memories at that moment. The paintings in the exhibition in 2007 were special to her because they represented her whole childhood, and her parents helped her to find the old things which appeared in her childhood. She left home when she finished her junior high school, so the home in her childhood seems to be far away from her, and every time what she dreamed was her childhood home. Therefore, she wanted to copy her childhood home in Beijing. In her first two years in Beijing, she felt lonely and what she could do was to paint and put her moods into the painting. She believed this is the reason why many people think that the girl in her painting was actually Chen Ke. And the girl in her painting grew up with the growth of Chen Ke. She thought she was lucky that she could cooperate with the Gallery after graduation. She joined many events with different zones of people because she wanted art to be linked with different people. She believed her art appeared from her daily life, so she hoped art could enter the daily lives of people. She thought fashion and art have no differences at the top point.

Artworks 

Chen Ke first showed her works in the 'Self-image: Women in the Arts in China (1920–2010)''' in 2001. And since then, she has been active in publishing her works in various magazines and books. In 2008, Chen Ke devoted to the 'Beyond dimension - China New Painting', which played an important role for her. Up to now, she is still making contributions to the art world and publishing more eye-catching art.

As classical artworks of Chen Ke, almost every piece of work shows a little girl with a round nose, who is lost in depression, limited to herself, living in an unreal space, and seems to keep a distance from the human world. Usually, the sad girl takes up the center of the whole artwork. With the full expression of the blank as well as the grain like porcelain painting, Chen Ke fully shows the opposition of the reality, which buries the audience in the waves of the sense of unknown sadness.

For Chen Ke, the trials on the painting media never stop its moving steps. Among the works completed in 2008, Chen Ke came up with some new ideas and made the painting just like manual, complementarity of calico with the painting mediator as well as the traditional oil painting materials are expressed to a large degree, making the sad girl changeable and seems to be jumping between the virtual world and the reality, which makes the audience lost in the endless loneliness and long distraction.

Like many young artists, Chen Ke takes her interest in various aspects - music, traveling, and reading are her favorites. In addition, she is also addicted to the analyses of the constellations, which also make a contribution to the sense of mystery in her works. Chen Ke uses painting to fill her life and express herself in her paintings. It is stated that she would be buried in a sense of constellation nothingness if she stops painting for a whole day. Chen likes challenges and is always seeking the power for achievements to satisfy her needs to be superior to herself and to seek a sense of herself. For Chen Ke, this achievement becomes more real and exciting than just remaining still and waiting for death.

Just like the show in 2007 in Star Gallery, with that old-style furniture appealing to the deep memory of Chen Ke when in her childhood, Chen Ke starts to do her re-creation; with flow of the trace of colors and the casual position of the girls, she expressed her sense of belongingness and her deep feeling about herself.

 Works 

 Publication 

In 2007, Chen Ke published a book of autobiography and paintings entitled "", 'Being with you and I will never feel lonely'. In this book, she told her story from being a little girl in a small city of Sichuan to becoming the most representative contemporary Chinese artist. And she also shared the memories that belong to the people of the 1970s. And her paintings have been included in both international and domestic books on art, including China - Facing Reality (2007), Avatars and Antiheroes: A Guide to Contemporary Chinese Artists (2008), and 19 Samples of Chinese Contemporary Female Artists (2008).

 Fashion 
Chen Ke has cooperated with many fashion brands. In 2008, Fendi invited Chen Ke to join the Fendi special handbags Baguette Anniversary commemorative edition series; she designed a handbag for the series. In 2014, Chen Ke designed for the Vogue FNO series to celebrate the ninth anniversary of Vogue magazine.

 Technology 
In 2015, Chen Ke designed 5 phone cases for the Jianguo phone of the Smartisan Technology Co., Ltd.

 Exhibitions 
Chen Ke had her sole show in Star Gallery, Kunsthaus Viernheim and Marella Gallery. Her artworks also have been exhibited in many other galleries in London, Berlin, Vienna, Bangkok, Beijing, Shanghai, Nanjing etc.

 Solo exhibitions 
2007: 
 With You, I Will Never Feel Lonely, Marella Gallery, Milan, Italy; Star Gallery, Beijing, China.
2008: 
 Personal War, Star Gallery, Beijing, China.
2009: 
 Another Me in the World, Viernheim, Germany.
2010: 
 Hard-Boiled Wonderland and the End of the World, Star Gallery, Beijing, China.
2012: 
With You, I Will Never Feel Lonely, Star Gallery, Beijing, China.

 Group exhibitions 
2001:
 First Chengdu Biennale Special Exhibition of Students won Rookie of the Year Award, Museum of Contemporary Art Chengdu, Chengdu, China.
 'Nightmare·people and Doll' Photography exhibition, Chengdu, China.
 'Rotation360---the 6th China Programme Art Exhibition' Chinese Contemporary Art Literature Exhibition, Shanghai, China.
2002:
 Floating Dream---the Contemporary Art Photography and Video from Southwest China, HongKong, China.
 'Pingyao International Photography Festival' China New Photography Festival, Pingyao, China.
 'Attention' Video and Photography Exhibition, Chongqing, China.
2003:
 'ListeningMen's Stories told by women' Conceptual Art Exhibition, Chongqing, China.
 'Direction' Experimental oil painting exhibition, Chongqin, China
 'Youth is power' Youth Art Exhibition, Shanghai, China
 The 2nd Guiyang Oil Painting Biennale Young Female Artist Joint Exhibits, Guiyang, China
2004:
 'Blue Space' Academic Invited Exhibition Chengdu, China
2005:
 'Next Station, Cartoon?', Hexiangning Art Museum, Shenzhen, China; Star Gallery, Beijing, China
 Future Archaeology---the 2nd China Art Triennale, Nanjing Museum, Nanjing, China
 Sight: Century and heaven---the 2nd Chengdu Biennalel, Chengdu Century City New International Convention and Exhibition Center. Chengdu, China
 The Self-Made Generation---Retrospective of New Chinese Painting, Shanghai Zendai moma, Shanghai, China
2006:
 Sky of bad boy, Star Gallery, Beijing, China
 Original: the new century of anime's aesthetics, MoCA, Shanghai, Shanghai, China
 Beyond Experience: New China, Arario Gallery, Beijing, China
 New Interface-up-Landing of New Generation, Red Bridge Gallery & Liu Haili Art Gallery, Shanghai, China
 Women in the bisexual community, Tang Contemporary Art Centre, Bangkok, Thailand
2007:
 Face the reality, Museum Moderner Kunst Stiftung Ludwig Wien (mumok), Vienna, Austria
 'Your View, My Story', Berlin, Germany
 Chen ke,  Li Jikai, Wei ji, Thomas Erben Gallery, New York, America
 'Floating---New Generation of Art in China', National Museum of Contemporary Art (South Korea), Seoul, South Korea
 Starting From Southwest---Southwest Contemporary Art Exhibition 1985–2007, Guangdong Museum of Art, Guangzhou, China
 Sweet and sour generation---Chinese New Art, Kunstverein, Mannheim, Germany
 The First Chapter of Comparison and Exceeding: Acrossing---Contemporary Art and Design, Contrasts Gallery, Beijing, China
2008:
 One man's War---Chen Ke individual art exhibition, Star Gallery, Beijing, China
 Beyond Cartoon-Asian Contemporary Art Group Show, Beyond Art Space, Beijing, China
 New InterfaceIV-Spring is coming, Red Bridge Gallery, Shanghai, China
 In the Mood for Paper, F2 Gallery, Beijing, China
 Deep Breath-Chinese Contemporary Female Art Exhibition, Greek Art, Shanghai, China
 Chen Ke, Marella Gallery, Milan, Italy
 Couples in Contemporary Art, MOCA Shanghai, Shanghai, China
 Looking For Me, Mingsheng Center for Contemporary Art, Shanghai, China
 The 2nd Shanghai MoCA Envisage: Butterfly, MOCA Shanghai, Shanghai, China
 Free China---BSI Swiss Foundation collection exhibition, Lugano, Switzerland
 Face the Reality---Contemporary Art, National Art Museum of China, Beijing, China
2009:
 China: the Contemporary Rebirth, Palazzo Reale, Milan, Italy
 Weaving a Chinese Dream Chinese elements in New Contemporary Art, Star Gallery, Beijing, China
 From Zero to Hero-Yangzi Apartment & Star Gallery, Star Gallery, Beijing, Shanghai
 Another me in the World, Kunsthaus Viernheim, Berlin, Germany
 Take you to China International Gallery Exposition, China World Trade Centre, Beijing, China
 The Mood For Paper, F2 Gallery, Beijing, China
2010:
 Self Image-Woman Art in China (1920–1020), The Art Museum of China Central Academy of Fine Arts, Beijing, China
 And Writers-the 1st Nanjing biennale, Jiangsu Art Museum, Nanjing, China
 Franks - Suss Collection Show, Saatchi Gallery, London, England
 The official opening of Minsheng Art Museum-the Thirty Years of Chinese Contemporary Art, Minsheng Art Museum, Shanghai, China
 Reshaping the history-Chinart from 2000 to 2009, China National Convention Center, Beijing, China
 Beyond Fashion- the 1st Crossover Between Young Chinese Fashion designers and Young Chinese Artists, Beyond Art Space, Beijing, China
 Hard-Boiled Wonderland and the End of the World, Star Gallery, Beijing, China
2011:
 Daybreak, Arario Gallery, Cheonan, South Korea
 'Shanshui-Poetry without Sound?' Landscape in Chinese Contemporary Art - Works from Sigg Collection, Kunstmuseum Lucerne, Lucerne, Switzerland
 Extract the 3rd Stall Keeper Show, C5 Art, Beijing, China
2012:
 China-Xinjiang the 1st Contemporary Art Biennale,  Xinjiang International Art Exhibition Center, Xinjing, China
 Spin-the First Decade of New Century, Today Art Museum, Beijing, China Liberation, Star gallery, Beijing, China
 Artdepot at SH Contemporary 2012, Shanghai Exhibition Center, Shanghai, China
 "Non bound"- Print Exhibition, +86 Design Museum, Beijing, China
 Face, Minsheng Art Museum, Shanghai, China
2013:
 Criss-Cross ArtWork of Chinese Young Chinese Contemporary Artists From Long Collection, Long Museum, Shanghai, China
 Anti-GM, Tang Contemporary Art, Beijing, China
 The Talk in Woodblock, Bridge Gallery Contemporary Woodblock Art Group Exhibition, Bridge Gallery, Beijing, China
 Uneasy Trip in Asia Stage1, Star Gallery, Beijing, China
 Exhibition for Nominated Young Artists in Asia, Today Art Gallery, Beijing, China
 Freda-a Woman Chen ke Exhibition, Hong Kong Convention and Exhibition Center, Hong Kong, China
2014:
 Uneasy Trip in Asia Stage2 2014, Star Gallery, Beijing, China
 Chengdu Blue Roof Art Festival, Blue Roof Museum of Chengdu, Chengdu, China
 "To the youth - our young age" Young Artists Group Exhibition,  Shanghai Hwas' Gallery, Shanghai, China
2015:
 It's Not Right But It's Okay, Ullens Center for Contemporary Art, Beijing, China
 Cover-Chenke Recent Works, Star Gallery, Beijing, China
 Art Taichung, Millennium Vee Hotel Taichung, Taichung, China Taiwan
 Group Exhibition 'Spring' Chen ke, Liu Aijing, Zheng Dongmei, Red Gate Gallery, Beijing, China
2016:
 Chinese Whispers-Chinese Contemporary Art Collection Exhibition, Kunstmuseum Bern and Zentrum Paul Klee, Switzerland

 Collection 
 The Franks-Suss Collection, London, UK
 The Sigg Collection, Lucerne, Switzerland
 Lorenzo Sassoli de Bianchi, Italy
 Shenzhen Art Museum, Shenzhen, China
 Minsheng Art Museum, Shanghai, China

 Recognition 
Chen Ke has received a lot of awards, including the 3rd Chinese New Painting Award (中国新锐绘画奖) and Nomination for " Young Artist of the Year 2008" by Award of Art China (艺术中国·年度青年艺术家).

 Publication 
Ke, Chen, 'With you and I will never feel lonely' <和你在一起，永远不孤单>,'' Beijing: China Youth Publishing House, 2012.

External links
 Chen Ke at Star Gallery

References

1978 births
Living people
Sichuan Fine Arts Institute alumni
Chinese sculptors
Chinese painters
Chinese women painters
Chinese women sculptors
Painters from Sichuan
People from Bazhong
21st-century Chinese sculptors